Delaplaine McDaniel House was a historic home and farm located at Kenton, Kent County, Delaware.  The house was built about 1880, and was a two-story, three bay, center hall plan stuccoed brick dwelling with a gable roof.  Attached to each gable end were one-story flat-roofed wings.  The front facade features en elaborate entrance reflective of a mix of architectural styles.  Also previously on the property were a frame tenant house with attached summer kitchen, servant's quarters dwelling, a large two-story barn, and a variety of agricultural outbuildings.  It was owned by Philadelphia merchant Delaplaine McDaniel, 1817-1885.  The historic house and farm were demolished sometime between 2017 and April 2020 to expand the adjacent crop field.

It was listed on the National Register of Historic Places in 1983.

References

Houses on the National Register of Historic Places in Delaware
Houses completed in 1880
Houses in Kent County, Delaware
Kenton, Delaware
National Register of Historic Places in Kent County, Delaware